Canal de Noticias de Nicaragua, News Channel of Nicaragua (better known by its initials CDNN 23 and also called Channel 23 for frequency of radio frequency transmission) is an open Nicaraguan television channel operated by the ESE Group (Emigdio Suárez Ediciones) and broadcasts from Managua, Nicaraguan capital.

CDNN 23 is sister company of Bolsa de Noticias, operated by the same group and founded in 1972 by the journalist Emigdio Suárez Sobalvarro.

Since its launch on August 3, 2000 by the frequency 23 UHF, the channel has broadcast a news program, opinion and interviews in its entirety of national production.

The top CDNN 23 shows are:

 Entrevistas CDNN: Interview program directed by journalist Plinio Suárez García, president of the channel.
 La Cobertura: Social Complaints Program directed by the journalist Elsbeth D'Anda.
 Noticieros CDNN: Stellar newscast.
 Bolsa de Mujeres TV: Gender promotion program directed by Xanthis Suárez García.
 Deportes CDNN: Stellar sports newscast.

Availability in domestic signal:

 Open signal: Channel 23 (UHF)
 Claro TV: Channel 23
 IBW: Channel 23

External links 
 

Television stations in Nicaragua
Spanish-language television stations
Television channels and stations established in 2000